Clement Vincent Tillion Jr. (July 3, 1925 – October 13, 2021) was an American politician. He was a member of the Alaska House of Representatives from 1963 to 1975 and the Senate from 1975 to 1981. He was the Senate president from 1979 to 1981. He served in the United States Navy during World War Two as a Seabee.

References

1925 births
2021 deaths
Republican Party members of the Alaska House of Representatives
People from Kenai Peninsula Borough, Alaska
Presidents of the Alaska Senate
Republican Party Alaska state senators
United States Navy sailors
Seabees
United States Navy personnel of World War II